Sherry Scheel Matteucci (born August 17, 1947) is an American attorney who served as the United States Attorney for the District of Montana from 1993 to 2001.

References

1947 births
Living people
United States Attorneys for the District of Montana
Montana Democrats